Hovannes Amreyan (born 3 October 1975 in Gyumri) is an Armenian weightlifter.  He won a silver medal at the 2001 European Weightlifting Championships.

References

External links 
 Hovannes Amreyan at Lift Up
 
 

1975 births
Living people
Armenian male weightlifters
European Weightlifting Championships medalists
Sportspeople from Gyumri